Yuliya Konstantinova Borisova (born 17 March 1925) is a Soviet and Russian stage and film actress. She has played in the Vakhtangov Theatre for more than sixty years. One of the most notable roles that she played was that of Nastasia Phillipovna in the film adaptation of Dostoevsky's novel The Idiot. She was also a politician, being member of the Supreme Soviet of Russia from 1963.

References

External links
 Герои страны

1925 births
Living people
20th-century Russian actresses
21st-century Russian actresses
Actresses from Moscow
Heroes of Socialist Labour
Honored Artists of the RSFSR
People's Artists of the RSFSR
People's Artists of the USSR
Recipients of the Order "For Merit to the Fatherland", 2nd class
Recipients of the Order "For Merit to the Fatherland", 3rd class
Recipients of the Order "For Merit to the Fatherland", 4th class
Recipients of the Order of Lenin
Recipients of the Order of the Red Banner of Labour
State Prize of the Russian Federation laureates
Russian film actresses
Russian stage actresses
Soviet film actresses
Soviet stage actresses